Capulus simplex is a species of small sea snail, a marine gastropod mollusk in the family Capulidae, the cap snails.

Description
The size of the shell attains 28 mm.

Distribution
This marine species occurs in European waters and off West Africa.

References

External links
 Locard A. (1897–1898). Expéditions scientifiques du Travailleur et du Talisman pendant les années 1880, 1881, 1882 et 1883. Mollusques testacés. Paris, Masson. vol. 1 [1897], pp. 1–516 pl. 1–22; vol. 2 [1898], pp. 1–515, pl. 1–18
 

Capulidae
Gastropods described in 1898